Thomas Holm (born 19 February 1981) is a Norwegian former professional footballer. A central midfielder, he played for SC Heerenveen, BV Veendam, Vålerenga, Molde, Tromsø, and Fredrikstad. He is the older half-brother of Vålerenga player Daniel Fredheim Holm.

Holm won the Tippeligaen with Vålerenga in 2005 and with Molde in 2011. He was capped four times for Norway.

Club career
Holm was born in Oslo, and grew up in Trosterud. He played for Vålerenga's youth team but transferred to Eredivisie club SC Heerenveen during the summer of 1998. Holm played as a right back and defensive midfielder under head coach Foppe de Haan, and in 2000 he signed a four-year contract with the club worth 10 million Norwegian kroner.

In the 2001–02 season, Holm was loaned out to BV Veendam., but moved back to Norway and Vålerenga in September 2002. He said that the move, which meant a drop in salary, was due to his belief in Vålerenga's ambitions and their supporters. The head coach of Vålerenga, Kjetil Rekdal had a high view of Holm, and said that he was a talented player with a big future, and the prefect replacement for himself in the midfield after his own retirement. Holm won the Norwegian Cup with Vålerenga in 2002.

Holm was unable to play during most of the 2003 season due to a calf fracture, but in 2004 he was back and was a contributing factor to Vålerenga's good season when they lost the league championship to Rosenborg on goal difference. In the next season, Vålerenga and Holm won the league, one point ahead of Start.

After a less active 2007 season, playing only six league games and fourteen games in total, Holm transferred to Molde. In total he played 145 matches for Vålerenga, and scored three goals. He played sixty league-matches during his first three seasons in Molde, and in 2009 he won silver in both the league and the cup with Molde. Nevertheless, after the 2010 season, Molde tried to sell Holm to other clubs but without any success, and Holm played under the leadership of the new manager Ole Gunnar Solskjær, until he was loaned to Tromsø in August 2011 for the rest of the 2011 season. Thus, Holm was both champion and runner-up of the 2011 Tippeligaen, as Molde won the league while Tromsø finished second.

On 14 January 2012, he signed a two-year contract with Fredrikstad, after leaving Molde on a free transfer, and on 14 April he scored his first goal for the club when Fredrikstad lost 2–1 against Rosenborg at home. He then retired. He became the assistant manager of Nordstrand IF in 2014.

International career
Holm played 38 times for different national youth teams, and 32 times for Norway U21.

After a season with Vålerenga in 2004, Holm made his debut for Norway against Australia at Craven Cottage in November 2004. His teammates at the club, Steffen Iversen, Erik Hagen and Ardian Gashi, were also a part of that national team squad. In total Holm has earned four caps with the Norwegian national team.

Career statistics
Source:

Honours
Vålerenga
Tippeligaen: 2005, runner-up 2004
Norwegian Cup: 2002

Molde
Tippeligaen: Champion 2011, runner-up 2009
Norwegian Cup: runner-up  2009

Tromsø
Tippeligaen: runner-up 2011

References

External links
  Player profile on official club website
  National Caps

Living people
1981 births
Footballers from Oslo
Association football midfielders
Norwegian footballers
Norway international footballers
Norway under-21 international footballers
Norwegian expatriate footballers
Expatriate footballers in the Netherlands
Norwegian expatriate sportspeople in the Netherlands
Eliteserien players
Eredivisie players
Eerste Divisie players
Vålerenga Fotball players
SC Heerenveen players
SC Veendam players
Molde FK players
Tromsø IL players
Fredrikstad FK players